Battle of the Sexes refers to a conflict between men and women.

Battle of the Sexes may also refer to:

Film
 The Battle of the Sexes (1914 film), American film directed by D. W. Griffith
 Battle of the Sexes (1920 film), a 1920 German silent film
 Battle of the Sexes (1926 film), a 1926 German silent comedy film

 The Battle of the Sexes (1928 film), American remake of 1914 film
 The Battle of the Sexes (1959 film), British comedy starring Peter Sellers
 Battle of the Sexes (2017 film), a 2017 biopic on the tennis encounter between  Billie Jean King and Bobby Riggs

Radio and television
 Battle of the Sexes (radio contest), a radio contest, TV show and board game
 Real World/Road Rules Challenge: Battle of the Sexes, an MTV competitive reality television show
 Real World/Road Rules Challenge: Battle of the Sexes 2, a sequel
 Battle of the Sexes, the subtitle for the season 2 premiere episode for the NBC's game show 1 vs. 100, aired January 4, 2008

Music
 Battle of the Sexes (album), a 2010 album by American rapper Ludacris
 "Battle of the Sexes", a single by Faith Hope & Charity
 "The Battle of the Sexes", a song by Tom Paxton from Redemption Road, 2015

Other
 Battle of the sexes (game theory), a game studied by game theorists
 Battle of the Sexes (tennis), a 1973 exhibition tennis match between Billie Jean King and Bobby Riggs.
 Geschlechterkampf (Battle of the Sexes – Franz von Stuck to Frida Kahlo), an art exhibition about gender roles
 Jordan Mixed Open, a 2019 tri-sanctioned golf tournament that is a more modern-day interpretation of the same ideal.
 Royal Poinciana Invitational, a 1962-63 pro golf event that was an early predecessor of the "Battle of the Sexes" concept in sport

See also